John Jeffrey  (born 1959) is a Scottish rugby union player.

John Jeffrey may also refer to:

John Jeffrey (botanist) (1826–1854), Scottish botanist and plant-hunter
John Jeffrey (judge), MP for Sussex, East Grinstead and Clitheroe
John Jeffrey (civil servant), Permanent Under-Secretary of State for Scotland

See also
John Jeffery (disambiguation)
Jeffrey John, priest

John Jeffreys (disambiguation)
John Jeffries (disambiguation)
John Jaffray (disambiguation)